Malika Zitouni is a French professional fitness athlete. She earned her WBFF Professional status by winning the Fitness Model Over 35 class at the WBFF World 2015 in Las Vegas.

Malika is an advocate for healthy lifestyles and nutrition. In September 2018, she opened La petite graine, a vegetarian restaurant in Limoges, France.

Competitions
Nabba Northern Ireland 2004: 2nd figure
Nabba Britain 2004: 3rd figure class 1
Nabba Universe 2004: 8th figure class 1
Nabba UK 2004: 3rd figure
Nabba Northern Ireland 2005: Winner figure Overall
Nabba Britain 2005: 2nd figure 1
NABBA Universe 2005: 6th figure class 1
Nabba Northern Ireland 2006: Winner
NABBA Britain 2006: 2nd figure class 1
WPF Scotland 2006: Winner
WPF European 2006: Overall Figure Winner
Nabba World 2006: 3rd figure class 1
Nabba Universe 2006: Winner Class 1
Pro Am Caledonia 2007: Winner
Nabba Britain 2007: Figure Overall Winner
Nabba World 2007: Overall Figure Winner
Nabba Universe 2007: Winner class 1
NAC World 2008: Overall Figure Winner
NAC Universe 2008: Winner class 1
WBFF 2015 PRO FITNESS Diva Over 35

References

Fitness and figure competitors
1973 births
Living people
Sportspeople from Limoges
French sportswomen
French sportspeople of Algerian descent
French expatriates in the United Kingdom